The Governor of Gravesend and Tilbury Fort (or West Tilbury) was the military officer responsible for paired fortifications and blockhouses protecting the River Thames: on the south side of the river at Gravesend, Kent and on the north side at Tilbury Fort and West Tilbury, Essex. The fortifications here date from the time of Henry VIII; Tilbury Fort remained in military use until 1950, but the office of Governor was discontinued upon the death of Sir Lowry Cole in 1842.

Governors
in 1651: Col. Crompton
1662–1669: Sir John Griffith
1669–1681: Sir Francis Leke, 1st Baronet (died 1679)
1681–1684: Richard Tufton, 5th Earl of Thanet
1684–1689: Sackville Tufton
1690–1702: William Selwyn
1702–1725: George Cholmondeley, 2nd Earl of Cholmondeley
1725–1736: William Tatton
1736–1737: Sir Multon Lambard
1737–1742: James Tyrrell
1742–1747: Adam Williamson
1747–1752: John West, 1st Baron De La Warr
1752–1776: Charles Cadogan, 2nd Baron Cadogan
1776–1796: William Fawcett
1796–1812: Sir Thomas Musgrave, 7th Baronet
1812–1818: Sir John Floyd, 1st Baronet
1818–1842: Sir Lowry Cole

Lieutenant-Governors
1702–1715: John Boteler
c.1727: Sir Multon Lambard
1758–1778: Sir Charles Whitworth
1778–1824: Hon. James de Courcy
1824–1827: James Hawker
Oct–Dec 1827: William Guard
1827–1832: Paul Anderson
1832–1848: Peter Dumas

References

History of Essex
History of Kent
History of Gravesend, Kent
Gravesend and Tilbury